Nikola Ðuričko (born 9 July 1974) is a Serbian actor.

Active in film, television, and in theater, his first notable role was in 1989, in the film Poslednji krug u Monci. 

In 1991, he played Djura in the play Dawn in East by Gordan Mihić.

He has received the Zoran Radmilović Award (2011), Miloš Žutić Award (2015), and the award for Best Actor at the FEST International Film Festival (2021).

Personal life 
Ðuričko was born in Belgrade, SR Serbia, SFR Yugoslavia and graduated from the Belgrade University of Arts School of Dramatic Arts. His first notable role was in 1989, in the film Poslednji krug u Monci. 

On 7 June 2004 Ðuričko married a woman he had met earlier that year on the set of The Cordon, where she worked as a production assistant and he had a leading role. Together they have a daughter and a son.

In late 2019, he moved from Serbia to Los Angeles with his family.

In 2022 he was based in Los Angeles.

Selected filmography

Film

Television

References

External links

1974 births
Living people
Male actors from Belgrade
20th-century Serbian male actors
University of Belgrade Faculty of Dramatic Arts alumni
21st-century Serbian male actors
Serbian male film actors
Serbian male voice actors
Serbian male stage actors
Miloš Žutić Award winners
Zoran Radmilović Award winners